JoNell Kennedy  has been an American actress, producer and writer since 1992. She is perhaps best known for her recurring role as "Coroner Pat" on The Mentalist. She also appeared on an episode of Southland.

Personal life
Kennedy was married to fellow actor Morocco Omari from 2001 until 2006.

Filmography

Film

Television

Video Games

External links
 
 
 JoNell Kennedy workout, height, & latest news

American television actresses
Year of birth missing (living people)
Living people
African-American actresses
20th-century American actresses
21st-century American actresses
20th-century African-American women
20th-century African-American people
21st-century African-American women
21st-century African-American people